Domingo Betanzos (died September 1549 at Valladolid) was a Spanish Dominican missionary to New Spain, who participated in the "Spiritual Conquest", evangelizing the indigenous.

Life
A native of León in Spain, he first studied jurisprudence at Salamanca, then became a Benedictine and lived as a hermit on the island of Ponza for five years. He then joined the Dominicans, who had established themselves on Hispaniola (Santo Domingo) in 1510. Betanzos went there four years later. At the time he went to Mexico in 1526, he was over 45 years old.

In 1516 he, with several other Dominicans, wrote a letter to Las Casas on the rapid disappearance of the Indians of the Antilles, concerning the numbers of the aboriginal population, and the excesses thought to have been committed by the Spaniards. In 1526, Betanzos went to Mexico, one of the first Dominicans; and he is considered the founder the Dominican province of Santiago de México. According to Franciscan fray Gerónimo de Mendieta, Betanzos did not know any native language and had little to do with Indians, his time being absorbed by administrative duties.

Tomás de Berlanga almost immediately claimed that it belonged to his newly founded province of Santa Cruz with the provincial seat at Santo Domingo. Betanzos went to Spain in 1531 and obtained from the Holy See the independence of his foundation. He also established the Dominican Province of Guatemala.

As Provincial of Mexico in 1535, he organized missions among three Indigenous groups stocks: the Nahua people, the Mixtec people, and the Zapotec people. He returned to Spain in 1549, and died in September of the same year at Valladolid. The Bishopric of Guatemala was tendered to Betanzos, but he declined it.

In his classic work on the evangelization of Mexico, French scholar Robert Ricard called Betanzos zealous, "an impetuous character, not well balanced, but not without intelligence" with a passionate temper.

A portrait of Betanzos on amatl (maguey paper) was held in the church of Tlazcantla, Tepetlaostoc (Mexico).

Views
In his letter of 1516, he acquiesced in the views of his brethren of the order on the question of Indian policy. In the "Opinion" (Parecer) given by him in 1541, and approximately repeated in 1542, just as the New Laws limiting the encomienda in the Indies were to be promulgated under the influence of Las Casas, he took an entirely different attitude. He quietly gave his opinion in a sense diametrically opposed to the measures Las Casas pressed upon the Government.

Betanzos was an intimate friend of distinguished Franciscans of Mexico – Archbishop of Mexico Fray Juan de Zumárraga, Fray Toribio de Benavente Motolinia, and others, who did not harmonize with Las Casas. When the Franciscans established the Colegio de Santa Cruz de Tlatelolco to educate elite Nahua men for the Christian priesthood, Betanzos objected to the Council of the Indies, calling into question the rationality of the Indians. Betanzos had questioned the ability of the Indians to understand doctrine sufficiently even to be baptized, which obviously would preclude their being trained for the priesthood. Betanzos argued that training an indigenous priesthood was a thoroughly bad idea because Indians would lack understanding and authority to preach and to teach and would spread heresy; and pulling out all the stops, he argued that teaching Indians Latin would allow them to expose the ignorance of [European] priests.

Betanzos's theological doubt about Indians' rationality was music to the ears of Spanish settlers wishing to exploit them. The Franciscan supporters of the establishment of a colegio to train Indian men for the priesthood pushed back against the Dominican's doubts.

Betanzos was in accord with the other mendicant orders (Franciscans and Augustinians) that they were not interested in reaping material benefit from the Indians, and did not require the payment of tithes (usually a ten percent tax on agriculture); Betanzos declined four Indian towns offered to the order.

He is credited with the authorship of an addition to the "Doctrina" of Fray Pedro de Córdoba which appeared in 1544, in collaboration with Franciscan Juan de Zumárraga.

References

Attribution
 The entry cites:
Ycazbalceta, Coleccion de Documentos para la Historia de Mexico (Mexico, 1866), I;
Domingo de Betanzos, Parecer;
Documentos ineditos de Indias, VII;
Carta a Bartolome de las Casas;
Mendieta, Historia ecclesiastica Indiana, 1599 (Mexico, 1870);
Davila Padilla, Historia de la fundacion y discurso de la provincia de Santiago de Mexico (2d ed., Brussels, 1625);
Beristain, Biblioteca Hispano-Americana setentrional (Mexico, 1816), I;
Remesal, Historia de la Provincia de San Vicente de Chyapa y Guatemala de la Orden de Santo Domingo (Madrid, 1619); the same book is also known as, Historia general de las Indias Occidentales y particular de la gobernacion de Chiapas y GuatemalaTeatro ecclesiastico de la primitiva Iglesia de las Indias occidentales (Madrid, 1649);
Diccionario de Historia y Geografia (Madrid, 1865), I.

16th-century Spanish people
Spanish Dominicans
Spanish Roman Catholic missionaries
Spanish Benedictines
1549 deaths
Year of birth unknown
University of Salamanca alumni
Dominican missionaries
Roman Catholic missionaries in New Spain